Alan James Irvine (born 29 November 1962) is a Scottish former footballer, who played as a striker for a number of clubs in Scotland, England, Japan and Northern Ireland.

Career
Irvine began his career with Blackburn United, but was also on Schoolboy forms with Hibernian, before signing at 16 on professional forms until 18. Irvine failed to make a senior appearance for the Easter Road side and moved to Whitburn Juniors, before joining Falkirk in 1983. After four years, and over 100 league appearances for the Bairns, Irvine moved to Liverpool. However, he made just four appearances during his time on Merseyside, one of which was as a second-half substitute in Liverpool's League Cup quarter-final win against Everton at Goodison Park.

A similarly short spell at Dundee United followed, before fifteen months at Shrewsbury Town. In 1989, Irvine moved to Japanese club Mazda, but returned to Scotland in 1990 with St Mirren, playing just under 40 times for the Buddies. Irvine then spent time with Northern Irish side Portadown, where his achilles tendon rupture side-lined him for two years. Alex Totten signed Irvine for a second time, beginning a final two-year playing spell with East Fife, where he retired from playing in 1995.

See also
 1987–88 Dundee United F.C. season

References

External links
 LFChistory.net player profile
 

1962 births
Living people
Scottish footballers
Hibernian F.C. players
Falkirk F.C. players
Liverpool F.C. players
Dundee United F.C. players
Shrewsbury Town F.C. players
St Mirren F.C. players
Portadown F.C. players
East Fife F.C. players
Sanfrecce Hiroshima players
Japan Soccer League players
Scottish expatriate footballers
Expatriate footballers in Japan
Blackburn United F.C. players
Association football forwards
Scottish Football League players
English Football League players
Scottish Junior Football Association players
NIFL Premiership players
Sportspeople from Broxburn, West Lothian
Footballers from West Lothian